Anurag University is a Private University located in Ghatkesar Medchal-Malkajgiri district, Telangana, India. Established in 2020, and is one of the First Private Universities in the State of Telangana. The Institution currently offers 15 UG Programs and 9 PG Programs through its Schools of Engineering, Management, Pharmacy and Science. 

The University is spread over 55+ acres with a total built-up area of over 1 mn.sq ft. The University is set up with top-notch infrastructure and facilities to train over 10000 students with the assistance of about 1000 teaching and non-teaching fraternity.

Accreditations
	Approved by AICTE New Delhi.
	All B.Tech and B.Pharmacy Programs have been accredited by the NBA. The Civil Engineering, Computer Science & Engineering, Electrical & Electronics Engineering and Electronics & Communication Engineering, Information Technology and Mechanical Engineering programs are accredited by NBA in Tier-I, valid up to 30.06.2025.
UGC Autonomous Institution. Anurag is included in 2(f) & 12(B) of UGC Act.
	Accredited with A Grade by NAAC (National Assessment and Accreditation Council).
	Affiliated to JNTU(H), Hyderabad. Autonomous status from JNTU(H). Recognized Research Center by JNTUH for Computer Science & Engineering, MBA and Pharmacy Programs.
	Pharmacy programs are approved by the Pharmacy Council of India (PCI).
TCS Accreditation.

Rankings 
Ranked 3rd Best Engineering College in Telangana and 13th Best Engineering College in South India- by Times Top Private Engineering Institute Rankings Survey - 2022.
   NIRF India Rankings 2022: 101-150 Rank-band in university, 140 Rank in Engineering, 58 in Pharmacy and 151-200 Rank-band in Overall category. NIRF India Rankings 2021: 101-150 Rank-band in university, 146 Rank in Engineering, 61 in Pharmacy and 151-200 Rank-band in Overall category. NIRF India Rankings 2020: 180 in Engineering, 76-100 Rank-band in Pharmacy, 151-200 Rank-band in Overall. NIRF India Rankings 2019: All India 160 Rank in Engineering, and 76-100 Rank-band in Pharmacy.
	Ranked 124 in Engineering Colleges in India, 92 in Pvt. Engg. Colleges category in India, 55 in South India Engg. Colleges category, 12 in Hyderabad Engg. Colleges category - by THE WEEK-Hansa Research Survey 2019 (Engineering Institute Rankings 2019) .
	Ranked 49th Best Engineering College in India - by Times Top Private Engineering Institute Rankings 2019.
	AAA+ Rating by Careers360 Ranking 2019.
	Ranked 74th Best Engineering College in India - by Times Top 100 Private Engineering Institute Rankings 2018.
	Ranked “8th Best Engineering College” in Telangana by The Week 2016.

Awards 
	Cisco Networking Academy Awarded the Anurag Group of Institutions as 1. Best Performing Academy in Digital Essentials at National Level 2. Best Performing Academy for Category Career Ready Courses for the Year-2019.
	Received Best Performing College award from Hon’ble President of India, by Ministry of Youth affairs & Sports, Govt. of India, on 21st Dec 2017.
	Ranked 74th Best Engineering College in India - by Times Top 100 Private Engineering Institute Rankings 2018.
	Anurag Group of Institutions has achieved “Distinguished College Award” from CSI TechNext India 2017.
	Winner of “Top Performing College Award” by IBM TGMC-2013 & 2015.
	“The Best Engineering College Award” by ISTE for All Round Performance of the year 2012.

Student Clubs in Anurag University 
Cultural Clubs 

 Technical Clubs

References

Universities in Telangana
Private universities in India
2020 establishments in Telangana
Educational institutions established in 2020
Universities established in the 2020s